Harpobittacus is a genus of hangingfly or scorpionfly of the family Bittacidae found in Australia.

Species
The genus contains the following species. 
Harpobittacus albatus 
Harpobittacus australis 
Harpobittacus christine 
Harpobittacus nigriceps 
Harpobittacus phaeoscius 
Harpobittacus quasisimilis 
Harpobittacus rubricatus 
Harpobittacus scheibeli 
Harpobittacus septentrionis 
Harpobittacus similis 
Harpobittacus tillyardi

References

Hangingflies
Insect genera
Insects of Australia